Radmila Dobnerová (born 3 May 1969) is a Czech sailor. She competed in the women's 470 event at the 1992 Summer Olympics.

References

External links
 

1969 births
Living people
Czech female sailors (sport)
Olympic sailors of Czechoslovakia
Sailors at the 1992 Summer Olympics – 470
Sportspeople from Prague